Dolerophyle is a monotypic moth genus in the family Geometridae described by William Warren in 1894. Its only species, Dolerophyle nerisaria, was described by Francis Walker in 1860. It is found in Brazil.

References

Desmobathrinae
Monotypic moth genera